Awkward Diary is the third album by the Iranian rock band Ahoora, released by Zirzamin on 2 March 2010.

Reception 
Some critics were disappointed by the new electronic progressive post-rock approach rather than progressive metal of the previous albums. Metal Invader called it progressive trip hop while Insomniac Magazine wrote: “As a band, Ahoora frequently shifts gears between Heavy Metal, Groove Metal, Hard Rock, Alternative and Jazz melodic meanderings mixed in with synths and other varied instruments”.  Classic Rock Magazine believed: “This shows some very nice touches. Imagine Muse and Tool getting all cozy around Iced Earth and you’ve got the drift here. The musicianship is accomplished, the songs concise and focused”.

Track listing

Personnel 
Milad Tangshir – guitars, backing vocals
Ashkan Hadavand – lead vocals
Mamy Baei – bass
Farzad Golpayegani – guitar solo on tracks 4 & 11
Darren Motamedy – Saxophone on track 11
Parviz Norouzi – Saxophone on tracks 4 & 5
Produced by Ahoora
Recorded & Mixed by Mamy Baei
Mastered by Farzad Golpayegani
Front cover by Richard Baxter
Back cover by Mattijn Franssen

References 

Ahoora albums
2010 albums